The Sikes House is a historic home in Fort White, Florida, United States. It is located at 288 Ellis Street, just south of US 27. On February 1, 2007, it was added to the U.S. National Register of Historic Places.

References

Houses in Columbia County, Florida
Houses on the National Register of Historic Places in Florida
National Register of Historic Places in Columbia County, Florida